Vatin is a French language surname.

People with the surname 

 Nicolas Vatin, French epigrapher and historian
 Pierre Vatin (born 1967), French politician

See also 

 Valin (surname)
 Valen (surname)
 Vatin culture
 Vatin, Serbia

Surnames
French-language surnames
Surnames of French origin